Christopher John Mahoney (June 11, 1885 – July 15, 1954) was a pitcher/center fielder in Major League Baseball who played briefly for the Boston Red Sox during the 1910 season. A native of Milton, Massachusetts, he studied at Fordham University and Manhattan College.

In a three-game career, Mahoney was a .143 hitter (1-for-7) and scored a run. In two pitching appearances, he posted a 0–1 record with a 3.27 ERA, including one start, one game finished, one save, six strikeouts, five walks, 16 hits allowed, and 11.0 innings of work.

Mahoney died in Visalia, California, at age 69.

External links

Retrosheet

Boston Red Sox players
Major League Baseball pitchers
Baseball players from Massachusetts
1885 births
1954 deaths
Fordham Rams baseball players
Manhattan Jaspers baseball players
People from Milton, Massachusetts
Sacramento Sacts players
Portland Colts players
Portland Beavers players
Sportspeople from Norfolk County, Massachusetts